Long Range is the code name of two fictional characters from G.I. Joe: A Real American Hero, a line of military-themed toys created by Hasbro. The first is Karl W. Fritz, who is the G.I. Joe Team's Thunderclap driver and debuted in 1989. He appeared in the comic book series and the DIC animated series.

The second fictional character to use the same code name was Alejandro Garcia the Joe's transportation expert. Debuting in 2005, this Long Range drives a Rolling Operations Command Center (R.O.C.C.).

Karl W. Fritz

Fictional character biography
He is the G.I. Joe team's Thunderclap vehicle driver. He debuted in 1989. His real name is Karl W. Fritz, and his rank is that of Sergeant First Class E-7. Long Range was born in Warwick, Rhode Island. Long Range's primary military specialty is Thunderclap driver, and his secondary military specialty is artillery.

As a kid, he struggled with simple arithmetic, but was able to master complex trigonometric and calculus problems with ease. He joined the Army's Artillery corps, where he utilized his trigonometric skills to amass the highest percentage rate of on-target knock outs the corps had ever seen and earn the nickname "The Knock Out Man".

A Real American Hero Toy history
Long Range was first released as an action figure in 1989, packaged with the Thunderclap long-range targeting cannon.

Comics - Original Continuity

G.I. Joe: A Real American Hero - Marvel Comics
In the Marvel comics G.I. Joe series, he first appeared in issue #92. He uses artillery fire from the 'Thunderclap' to help rescue fellow Joes and members of the Oktober Guard.

G.I. Joe: A Real American Hero - IDW
Later, in the same continuity, Long-Range works with Alpine, Torpedo and Muskrat to rescue peace activist and long-time Joe ally Dr. Adele Burkhart. They are pursued through the mountains of fictional country Olliestan by a murderous group of fanatics, enraged that Burkhart is support education for women. Long-Range works closely with Torpedo to draw off attention from the others supporting Adele but their efforts are not as successful as they hope.

Animated series appearances

DIC Series
Long Range appeared in the DiC G.I. Joe animated series episode titled "Operation Dragonfire" Pt. 2 in a non-speaking cameo role.

Alejandro Garcia

Fictional character biography
He is described as studying various philosophical works like Aristotle, Zeno, and Diogenes. As the Joe's R.O.C.C. driver, he will not let anything stop him from completing his objective.

A Real American Hero Toy history
The second Long Range was first released as an online exclusive released in 2005 as the driver of and bundled with the 'Rolling Operations Command Center.

Comics
In the Devil's Due G.I. Joe: Sigma 6 comics, he first appeared in issue #1, and played a prominent role in issue #5.

Animated series appearances
Long Range appeared in the G.I. Joe: Sigma 6 animated series. Along with driving the R.O.C.C., he was also the team's sniper.

References

External links
 Long Range at JMM's G.I. Joe Comics Home Page

Comics characters introduced in 1989
Fictional characters from Rhode Island
Fictional drivers
Fictional Mexican people
Fictional military sergeants
Fictional United States Army personnel
G.I. Joe soldiers
Male characters in animated series
Male characters in comics